Reductoderces aucklandica is a moth of the family Psychidae. It was described by John S. Dugdale in 1971. It is found on the Auckland Islands in New Zealand.

References

 Reductoderces aucklandica in species id

Moths described in 1971
Moths of New Zealand
Psychidae